Croatia osiguranje d.d. (English: Croatia Insurance) is an insurance company based in Zagreb.

Croatia osiguranje is the largest and oldest insurance firm in Croatia. As of 2018, its share in the Croatian insurance market is approximately 32%.

Founded in 1884 in Zagreb as Croatia osiguravajuća zadruga (Croatia Insurance Society), one of its founders was the famous Croatian writer August Šenoa. It is main sponsor of Croatian handball club RK Osiguranje Zagreb, which bears the name of its sponsor.

Croatian government was the majority owner of Croatia osiguranje until 2014, when the controlling share was acquired by Adris grupa.

Branches: Podružnica Dubrovnik, Podružnica Kutina, Podružnica Osijek, Podružnica Pula, Podružnica Rijeka, Podružnica Slavonski Brod, Podružnica Split, Podružnica Varaždin, Podružnica Zabok, Podružnica Zadar, Podružnica Zagreb, Podružnica Zagrebački prsten-Velika Gorica.

References

External links
 

Financial services companies established in 1884
Insurance companies of Croatia
Companies listed on the Zagreb Stock Exchange
1884 establishments in Croatia
Financial services in Zagreb